Louth is a barony in County Louth, Republic of Ireland.

Etymology
Louth barony is named after the village of Louth (Irish: Lú, named after the god Lugh).

Location

Louth barony is found in central County Louth, mostly between the River Glyde and River Fane.

Louth barony is bordered to the north by Dundalk Upper; to the south by Ardee; and to the west by Farney, County Monaghan.

History
Louth barony was formed from Ludha, or Lugha, the country of the Ó Cearbhaill Oirialla (O'Carroll of Oriel).

List of settlements

Below is a list of settlements in Louth barony:
Louth
Tallanstown

References

Baronies of County Louth